Huaning County is a county under the administration of Yuxi, in east-central Yunnan Province, China.

Administrative divisions
Huaning County has 1 subdistrict, 3 towns and 1 ethnic township. 
1 subdistrict
 Ningzhou
3 towns
 Panxi
 Huaxi
 Qinglong
1 ethnic township
 Tonghongdian Yi and Miao

Ethnic groups

Yi
The Huaning County Gazetteer 华宁县志 (1994:514) lists the following six Yi subgroups and their respective geographic distributions.

Nong 弄 (Longmu 龙亩; also called Luowu 罗婺)
Xincheng Township 新城乡: Xincheng 新城, Longmu 龙亩, Kazhai 卡寨, Sheyingzhai 舍阴寨, Shemuduo 舍亩多, Suojugou 所居沟, Pusulu 普苏鲁
Azhe 阿者/阿哲
Panxi Township 盘溪乡 (near Mile and Jianshui): Xincun 新村, Fangna 方那, Jiudian 九甸, Xiaolongtan 小龙潭
Adu 阿笃
Qinglong Town 青龙镇: Songzichang 松子场, Xinzhai 新寨, Douju 斗居, Chengmendong 城门洞, Niuqiduo 牛期多
Lufeng Township 禄丰乡: Gele 革勒
Xiqi (autonym: ; cf. Siqipo of Mile County)
Tonghongdian Township 通红甸乡: Suomeizao 所梅早村, Dapozuo 大婆左村
Panxi Township 盘溪乡: Yide 矣得村, Fagao 法高村, Dayaxi 大丫喜村, Longtanying 龙潭营村
Chengjiao Township 城郊乡: Dengloushan 登楼山, Puchazhai 普茶寨
Huaxi Township 华溪乡: Xishajing 西沙井村, Dujia 独家村
Qinglong Township 青龙镇: Shanqi 山歧村, Qize 起则村
Ati 阿梯/阿替
Huaxi Township 华溪乡: Xiaozhai 小寨, Daxinzhai 大新寨, Heiniubai 黑牛白
Chengjiao Township 城郊乡: Faguo 法果, Mada 吗哒, Zanle 咱乐, Chongmai 冲麦
Xincheng Township 新城乡: Longmu 龙亩, Tulaoyi 土老依, Naguo 那果
Tonghongdian Township 通红甸乡: Zele 则勒, Momian 磨面, Xiaoguodi 小锅底
Qinglong Township 青龙镇: Zhongcun 中村, Yifu 矣甫, Daomakan 倒马坎
Lufeng Township 禄丰乡: Chekaibi 扯开比
Axi 阿细
Panxi Township 盘溪乡, among the Azhe

The following six Yi subgroups were recorded during the Qing Dynasty.
White Lolo 白倮倮
Black Lolo 黑倮倮
Miao Lolo 妙倮倮
Ati 阿替
Azhe 阿者
Pute 普特

Miao
The following Miao subgroups reside in Huaning County, by order of population size (Huaning County Gazetteer 1994:515):
Flowery Miao 花苗 (autonym: Mengzhou 猛昼)
Sinicized Miao 汉苗 (autonym: Mengsha 猛沙)
White Miao 白苗

Their locations are:
Tonghongdian Township 通红甸乡: Liuzhai 六寨, Xiaonuojie 小糯节, Zhongzhai 中寨, Xiaopozuo 小婆左, Tangzi 塘子, Guobenglong 狗崩竜, Xiaodele 小得勒, Tonghongdian 通红甸, Xiaolila 小里拉, Xiaoji'ao 箫箕凹, Momian 磨面
Huaxi Township 华溪乡: Zanlongtan 咱龙潭, Mushebai 暮舍白
Panxi Township 盘溪乡: Chaoyangzhai 朝阳寨, Zhongshan 钟山, Pingba Xiaozhai 平坝小寨, Dayanzi 大岩子
Qinglong Township 青龙镇: Laoyingwo 老鹰窝, Daomakan 倒马坎, Hongpo 红坡, Ma'anshan 马鞍山, Xinzhai 新寨, Douni 斗尼
Lufeng Township 禄丰乡: Shimen 石洞, Luojiawuju 罗家屋居, Zhugudou 住姑斗
Chengjiao Township 城郊乡: Longdong 龙洞村
Ningzhou Town 宁州镇

Climate

References

External links
Huaning County Official Website

 
County-level divisions of Yuxi